Kingsway Jewish Center is a historic Modern Orthodox synagogue at 2810 Nostrand Ave. in Midwood, Brooklyn, New York, New York.

History
The Center complex includes the synagogue (1951), school block (1957), and catering hall wing (c. 1957).  The synagogue features a series of 18 windows designed by Abstract Expressionist artist Adolph Gottlieb.  It is a four-story steel frame building with a brick faced facade that steps back from the property line as it rises.  The school building is a simple three story building with long rectangular windows and several entrances.

It was listed on the National Register of Historic Places in 2010.

References

External links

Kingsway Jewish Center website

Synagogues completed in 1951
Properties of religious function on the National Register of Historic Places in Brooklyn
Synagogues in Brooklyn
Midwood, Brooklyn
Synagogues on the National Register of Historic Places in New York City
1951 establishments in New York City
1928 establishments in New York City
Jewish organizations established in 1928
Orthodox synagogues in New York City
Art Deco architecture in Brooklyn